Nahar (also Romanized as Nahār; also known as Nagar’) is a village in Azghan Rural District, in the Central District of Ahar County, East Azerbaijan Province, Iran. At the 2006 census, its population was 289, in 57 families.

References 

Populated places in Ahar County